Jerry D. Harris Jr. is a retired United States Air Force lieutenant general who last served as the Deputy Chief of Staff for Plans and Programs of the United States Air Force. Prior to that, he was the Deputy Chief of Staff for Strategic Plans, Programs, and Requirements of the United States Air Force.

References

External links
 

Year of birth missing (living people)
Living people
Place of birth missing (living people)
United States Air Force generals